Mostarska Bijela or simply Bijela is a mountain creek and gorge in Bosnia and Herzegovina. Despite its low discharge and relatively short flow, this river takes a significant place in Bosnia and Herzegovina's Dinaric karst's geology and hydrology.

Geography

The Mostarska Bijela is left tributary of the Neretva river. It begins at the south-western slopes of Prenj mountain, where it's called Gornja Bijela ("Gornja" in English: "Upper"), and flows in direction of north to south-southwest and into the Neretva at Bijela village in the region of Drežnica Donja and Salakovac.

Rare geology
The Mostarska Bijela river shapes a rare and unique karstic geological feature, which resembles an underground river with canyon-like semi-underground flow. What is unique here, in case of the Mostarska Bijela, is that cave roof of its underground section is opened to surface in form of very narrow gap in many places, enough only for small amount of light to enter the cavernous river course. Although very difficult underground course is still traversable, and thus attractive for tourists, mountaineers, especially for canyoning and speleologist.

Highway A1 Corridor Vc environmental controversy
According to the first variant of the proposed route of a new highway through Prenj, valleys of the Konjička Bijela and the Mostarska Bijela should be heavily affected, where not much of its natural environment would remained. Beautiful karst phenomenons of deep canyons, underground waterfalls and caves in Mostarska Bijela valley will be destroyed, or at least covered by the asphalt, concrete or stone fill from the tunnels.

See also

 List of rivers in Bosnia and Herzegovina
Neretva
Prenj
Dinaric Alps
Subterranean river

References

External links
Mostarska Bijela at SummitPost.org

Rivers of Bosnia and Herzegovina
Karst formations of Bosnia and Herzegovina
Subterranean waterfalls
Subterranean rivers of Bosnia and Herzegovina
Canyons and gorges of Bosnia and Herzegovina